Yasuji is a masculine Japanese given name.

Possible writings
Yasuji can be written using different combinations of kanji characters. Here are some examples:

康二, "healthy, two"
康次, "healthy, next"
康治, "healthy, to manage"
康児, "healthy, child"
康爾, "healthy, you"
靖二, "peaceful, two"
靖次, "peaceful, next"
靖治, "peaceful, to manage"
靖児, "peaceful, child"
靖爾, "peaceful, you"
安二, "tranquil, two"
安次, "tranquil, next"
安治, "tranquil, to manage"
保二, "preserve, two"
保次, "preserve, next"
保児, "preserve, child"
泰二, "peaceful, two"
泰次, "peaceful, next"
泰治, "peaceful, to manage"
易児, "divination, child"
易慈, "divination, mercy"

The name can also be written in hiragana やすじ or katakana ヤスジ.

Notable people with the name
, Japanese baseball player and manager
, Japanese rower
, Japanese photographer
, Japanese war criminal and activist
, Japanese weightlifter
, Japanese composer
, Japanese swimmer
, Japanese animator
, Japanese animator
, Japanese general
Yasuji Sasaki (佐々木 康二, born 1967), Japanese chef

Japanese masculine given names